Deb Callahan is an American environmental and political leader. In 2011, she became the executive director of the Point Reyes National Seashore Association in the San Francisco Bay area. Previously she served as president of The H. John Heinz III Center For Science, Economics And The Environment, a Washington, DC, nonprofit institution dedicated to improving the scientific and economic foundation for environmental policy.

Callahan is the immediate past president of the League of Conservation Voters, where she served as president for ten years.  Prior to her work there, she served as the founding executive director for the Brainerd Foundation and was a program officer for the W. Alton Jones Foundation, both prominent environmental grant making foundations. She has worked in advocacy organizations and on Capitol Hill, including the National Clean Air Coalition, the National Toxics Campaign and in the US Senate.

Callahan has also managed and staffed numerous electoral campaigns including the presidential campaigns of Vice Presidents Al Gore and Walter Mondale, and campaigns for Senator Kent Conrad, Congressman Howard Wolpe and Congressman George Brown.  She has served on numerous boards of directors, including America Votes, the Federation of State Conservation Voter Leagues, World Resources Institute and the Earth Day Network. A nationally known spokesperson and media commentator on environmental and progressive political issues, in 2004 Callahan became the first environmental organizational representative to address the Democratic National Convention.

She is married to Ken Cook, president of the Environmental Working Group. She graduated in 1981 from the University of California, Santa Barbara with a degree in Environmental Studies and Political Science.

Prior positions

 Executive Director (1995–1996), Brainerd Foundation
 Program Officer (1992–1994), W. Alton Jones Foundation
 Policy Consultant (1991–1992), National Toxics Campaign
 Campaign Manager (1990–1991), Wolpe congressional campaign
 National Field Director (1987–1988), Gore presidential primary campaign
 Executive Assistant (1986–1987), Office of Senator Kent Conrad
 New England political director (1985–1986), League of Conservation Voters
 Deputy Campaign Manager (1986), Conrad senatorial campaign
 Field Coordinator (1984), Mondale-Ferraro presidential campaign

References

League of Conservation Voters, LCV President Deb Callahan Steps Down After 10 Years of Service to the Organization. Accessed January 26, 2006.
Interview, Road Trip Nation,

External links
 EarthFocus Interview: Deb Callahan
 Grist Magazine Interview: Deb Callahan

American environmentalists
American women environmentalists
Living people
Year of birth missing (living people)
21st-century American women